Burdick is an unincorporated community in Morris County, Kansas, United States. It was named after Ms. Burdick, the sweetheart of a Santa Fe Railroad official in 1887. As of the 2020 census, the population of the community and nearby areas was 62.

History

Early history

For many millennia, the Great Plains of North America was inhabited by nomadic Native Americans.  From the 16th century to 18th century, the Kingdom of France claimed ownership of large parts of North America.  In 1762, after the French and Indian War, France secretly ceded New France to Spain, per the Treaty of Fontainebleau.

19th century

In 1802, Spain returned most of the land to France.  In 1803, most of the land for modern day Kansas was acquired by the United States from France as part of the 828,000 square mile Louisiana Purchase for 2.83 cents per acre.

From the 1820s to the 1870s, one of the most significant land routes in the United States was the Santa Fe Trail. A large stone stage station, named "Six Mile Stage Station" was built at this location as a rest stop. In 1863, Charles Atkinson witnessed approximately 600 Cheyenne Indians raided this station. DAR Marker #29 was dedicated on October 9, 1908 at this location.

In 1854, the Kansas Territory was organized, then in 1861 Kansas became the 34th U.S. state.  In 1859, Morris County was established within the Kansas Territory, which included the land for modern day Burdick.

In 1880, a Swedish settlement called Linsdale was created, consisting of Swedish immigrants from Henry and Mercer counties of Illinois.  In 1887, the community name was changed to Burdick, in honor of Ms. Burdick, the sweetheart of a Santa Fe Railroad official.

In 1887, Atchison, Topeka and Santa Fe Railway built a branch line from Neva (3 miles west of Strong City) to Superior, Nebraska.  This branch line connects Strong City, Neva, Rockland, Diamond Springs, Burdick, Lost Springs, Jacobs, Hope, Navarre, Enterprise, Abilene, Talmage, Manchester, Longford, Oak Hill, Miltonvale, Aurora, Huscher, Concordia, Kackley, Courtland, Webber, Superior.  In 2006, the line from Neva to Lost Springs was pulled but the right of way has not been abandoned.  This branch line was originally called "Strong City and Superior line" but later the name was shortened to the "Strong City line".  In 1996, the Atchison, Topeka and Santa Fe Railway merged with Burlington Northern Railroad and renamed to the current BNSF Railway.  Most locals still refer to this railroad as the "Santa Fe".

A post office was established in Burdick on August 29, 1887.

Geography
Burdick is located at  (38.5636222, -96.8455682) at an elevation of 1,453 feet (443 m).

Climate
The climate in this area is characterized by hot, humid summers and generally mild to cool winters.  According to the Köppen Climate Classification system, Burdick has a humid subtropical climate, abbreviated "Cfa" on climate maps.

Demographics

For statistical purposes, the United States Census Bureau has defined this community as a census-designated place (CDP).

Economy
Although Burdick is unincorporated, it has a post office with the ZIP code of 66838.

Area events
 Annual Burdick Labor Day Weekend Festival

Education
The community is served by Centre USD 397 public school district.  The high school is a member of T.E.E.N., a shared video teaching network between five area high schools.
 Centre School; 2374 310th St, Lost Springs, KS; between Lost Springs and Lincolnville, east of U.S. 77 highway.

History
In the 1910s, Burdick and Diamond Springs formed a high school district. In 1921, Diamond Valley High School was completed.  The first class graduated in 1923 with three students.  Due to decreasing attendance, the high school closed its doors in 1957.

Films
 Bill's Run: A Political Journey in Rural Kansas, a 2004 feature documentary about William Kassebaum running for State Congress, which includes video of the local area.

Media

Print
 The Herington Times, newspaper from Herington.
 Hillsboro Free Press, free newspaper for greater Marion County area.
 The Salina Journal, regional newspaper from Salina.

Infrastructure

Transportation

Utilities
 Internet
 Satellite Internet is provided by HughesNet, StarBand, WildBlue.
 TV
 Satellite TV is provided by DirecTV, Dish Network.
 Free over-the-air ATSC digital TV.

Notable people
 Nancy Kassebaum, United States Senator from 1978 to 1997, lives on a ranch near Burdick.
 William Kassebaum, lawyer, rancher, former member of the Kansas House of Representatives, son of Nancy Landon Kassebaum, brother of Richard Kassebaum.

See also
 National Register of Historic Places listings in Morris County, Kansas
 Santa Fe Trail

References

Further reading

External links

Historical
 Welcome to Burdick, Pop. 60, PBS.org
 Burdick History, legendsofkansas.com
 Historic Images of Burdick, Special Photo Collections at Wichita State University Library.
 Maps
 Morris County maps: Current, Historic, KDOT
 Topo Map of Burdick / Diamond Springs / Delavan area, USGS

Unincorporated communities in Morris County, Kansas
Unincorporated communities in Kansas